Yugo-Kamsky is a rural locality (a settlement) and the administrative center of Yugo-Kamskoye Rural Settlement, Permsky District, Perm Krai, Russia. The population was 8,019 as of 2010. There are 125 streets.

Geography 
Yugo-Kamsky is located 55 km southwest of Perm (the district's administrative centre) by road. Poludennaya is the nearest rural locality.

References 

Rural localities in Permsky District